The following is a list of the speakers found in the dialogues traditionally ascribed to Plato, including extensively quoted, indirect and conjured speakers.  Dialogues, as well as Platonic Epistles and Epigrams, in which these individuals appear dramatically but do not speak are listed separately.

Unnamed speakers

Notes

Bibliography
 Debra Nails. The People of Plato: A Prosopography of Plato and Other Socratics. Hackett Publishing, 2002. .
 Plato. Complete Works. Ed: John M. Cooper.  Hackett Publishing, 1997.

Platos Dialogues
Speakers in Plato's dialogues